Teofilis Tilvytis (28 January 1904 – 5 May 1969) was a Lithuanian poet. He was born in Gaidžiai in the Tauragnai district, Ukmergė county. He studied at the Panevėžys and Utena gymnasiums, before joining the Tax Inspectorate in Kaunas where he worked from 1923 to 1930. He studied acting at the National Theatre, and appeared in performances of the Vilkolakis Theatre troupe. He also began writing seriously from the mid-1920s, and between 1933 and 1940, he edited or co-edited the satirical newspaper Kuntaplis. 

He was imprisoned in the Pravieniškės concentration camp during the Nazi occupation of Lithuania. A Communist Party loyalist, he served in a variety of official roles from the 1940s to the 1960s; for 16 years, he was a member of the Supreme Soviet of the Lithuanian SSR. 

He became well-known for his literary parodies and humorous poems, often based on current events. Some notable poems in this vein are Sale of Dust (1928), the long serial poem Artojėliai (1930-1965), and Dičius (1934), which was turned into a TV film by the director B. Bratkauskas. The socialist realist poem "Usnynė" won the USSR State Prize in 1951. Other poetry collections include Baltic Wind (1948), Sonnets about Happiness (1951), Homeland Walls (1953), Homes My Precious (1958), etc. He wrote the poem The Song of Life (1962) in memory of V. Montvila. He also wrote several novels, and a travel book Vilnius – Stalinabad (1948).

Later books include Swirls (1968), Laukai laukeliai (1974), Skiedra (1976), etc. 
He translated works of Russian literature into Lithuanian, 
and his work was in turn translated into Russian. He died in Vilnius in 1969.

References

Lithuanian writers
1904 births
1969 deaths